Hilde Kellogg (October 17, 1918 – November 22, 2010) was an American politician from Idaho. Kellogg was a Republican member of Idaho House of Representatives.

Early life 
On October 17, 1918, Kellogg was born in Scottsbluff, Nebraska. Kellogg's father was Adolf F. Thute, a German immigrant. Kellogg's mother was Anna Elizabeth (new Dell) Thute, a Russian immigrant. Kellogg's siblings include Richard Thute, William Thute, Helen Thute, and Betty Thute. In 1935, Kellogg graduated from Grand Island Senior High School in Grand Island, Nebraska.

Career 
Kellogg was a dental assistant in Nebraska.

In 1952, Kellogg was a businesswoman and the owner of a retail Western Wear store in Post Falls, Idaho, until 1981.

In 1974, Kellogg became the chairman of Planning and Zoning Commission in Post Falls, Idaho, until 1980.

In 1976, Kellogg's political career began when she became a city council member of Post Falls, Idaho, where she served until 1980.

In 1992, Kellogg was a member of Idaho House of Representatives for District 2 seat A, until 2000.

On November 5, 2002, Kellogg won the election and became a Republican member of Idaho House of Representatives for District 5 seat A. Kellogg defeated Kristy Reed Johnson and Mary Rutkowski with 56.0% of the votes.

In 2004, after 22 years in the Idaho House of Representatives, Kellogg retired at age 83.

Awards 
 2001 Post Falls Citizen of the Year.

Personal life 
Kellogg's husband was Jack Kellogg (died 1965). Kellogg had no children. In 1950, Kellogg and her husband moved from Nebraska to Idaho. Kellogg lived in Post Falls, Idaho.

On November 22, 2010, Kellogg died in Coeur d'Alene, Idaho at age 92. Kellogg is buried in Evergreen Cemetery in Post Falls, Idaho.

Kellogg's sister Betty Elizabeth Garrett (1932-2011) had lived in Post Falls, Idaho and Helen Margetic lives in Plainfield, Illinois.

Legacy 
 Hilde Kellogg Park. Post Falls, Idaho.
 February 18, 2005 dedicated as Hilde Kellogg Day.

References

External links 
 Hilde Thute in 1940 Census at archives.com
 Hilde Kellogg at blogspot.com
 Hilde Kellogg at findagrave.com
 2005 Proclamation
 Kellogg's sister Betty Elizabeth Garrett at cdapress.com

1918 births
2010 deaths
Republican Party members of the Idaho House of Representatives
Women state legislators in Idaho
People from Scottsbluff, Nebraska
People from Coeur d'Alene, Idaho
20th-century American politicians
20th-century American women politicians
21st-century American politicians
21st-century American women politicians